The McDonald Institute for Archaeological Research is a research institute of the University of Cambridge in England.

History
The institute was established in 1990 through a benefaction from the late Dr Daniel McLean McDonald, a successful industrialist: the endowment totalled approximately £11 million. McDonald (1905 – 1991) was founder and chairman of the BSR Group, manufacturers of record turntables and record changers. The benefaction enabled the University to construct purpose-built premises for the Institute which include research rooms and laboratories, together with storage space, a seminar room and a modest library.

Mission and purpose
The Institute provides support for Cambridge-based researchers in the various branches of archaeology, with a particular interest in the archaeology of early human cognition. The Institute emphasises the value of archaeological science, and contains laboratories for geoarchaeology, archaeozoology, archaeobotany, and artefact analysis. The extensive faunal remains collection of the Department of Archaeology is now based within the McDonald Institute and a corresponding reference collection of plant remains is being assembled. There are also research rooms for post-excavation work on major field projects.

The institute is primarily a centre for post-doctoral research though it does provide facilities for a number of PhD students whose research fits within existing McDonald Institute themes.  In addition to providing space for projects and researchers, the McDonald Institute also has an annual programme of grants for Cambridge-based projects, and an active publications division which produces the McDonald Institute Monograph series and the twice-yearly Cambridge Archaeological Journal.

Notable people
 Roger Bland, Senior Fellow since 2015
 Cyprian Broodbank, Director since October 2014
 Norman Hammond, Senior Fellow 
 Mei Jianjun, Fellow 
 David Oates, Fellow from 1997 to 2004
 Joan Oates, Senior Research Fellow since 1995
 Colin Renfrew, Director from 1990 to 2004, Senior Fellow since 2004 
 Jane Renfrew, Senior Fellow
 Chris Scarre, Deputy Director from 1990 to 2005
 Anthony Snodgrass, Senior Fellow
 Simon Stoddart, Acting Deputy Director from 2014 to 2017

References

External links
 McDonald Institute for Archaeological Research website

Educational institutions established in 1990
Archaeological Research, McDonald Institute for
Archaeological research institutes
Research institutes in Cambridge
Research institutes established in 1990
1990 establishments in the United Kingdom